Mary Elmer Lake is a reservoir on the Cohansey River in Cumberland County, New Jersey, used for water-supply and recreation purposes.

Description
The lake is located in the park system of the city of Bridgeton, New Jersey, and is owned by the city. While the dam is within the city limits, most of the lake is within neighboring Hopewell Township.

The lake is fed by Barrett's Run, and the lake's water empties via a small stream into nearby Sunset Lake and thence into the Cohansey River.

History
Mary Elmer Lake was originally known as Ireland's Mill Pond. Construction of the dam was completed in 1924 by the U.S. Army Corps of Engineers. The name was later changed to Mary Elmer Lake.

See also
 Bridgeton, New Jersey Flood of 1934

References

Bridgeton, New Jersey
Hopewell Township, Cumberland County, New Jersey
Bodies of water of Cumberland County, New Jersey
Reservoirs in New Jersey